Argada (Argata) is a rural locality (an ulus) in Kurumkansky District, Republic of Buryatia, Russia. The population was 1,687 as of 2010. There are 19 streets.

Geography 
Argada is located 45 km southeast of Kurumkan (the district's administrative centre) by road. Ilichkin is the nearest rural locality.

References 

Rural localities in Kurumkansky District